Keerangudi  is a village in the Kudavasal taluk of Tiruvarur district in Tamil Nadu, India.

Demographics 

As per the 2001 census, Keerangudi had a population of 1,520 with 744 males and 776 females. The sex ratio was 1043. The literacy rate was 73.52.

References 

 

Villages in Tiruvarur district